Below are the squadsfor the 1997 FIFA World Youth Championship tournament in Malaysia. Those marked in bold went on to earn full international caps.

Group A









Group B









Group C









Group D









Group E









Group F









Notes

References

External links
FIFA.com

FIFA U-20 World Cup squads
Fifa World Youth Championship Squads, 1997